Sialic acid binding Ig-like lectin 15 is a protein that in humans is encoded by the SIGLEC15 gene.

References

Further reading